G3 is a Canadian grain company headquartered in Winnipeg, Manitoba. It consists of two operating companies:

 G3 Canada Limited operates a network of grain elevators in western Canada and port terminals in eastern Canada. G3 purchases grains and oilseeds from farmers, who deliver the crops to G3 facilities by truck. The commodities are transferred to trains and/or ships and shipped to customers around the world. The company owns the Great Lakes bulk carrier vessel G3 Marquis and a fleet of grain hopper railway cars.
 G3 Terminal Vancouver, a grain export terminal at the Port of Vancouver which opened in 2020.

History
G3 Canada Limited was created in 2015, when G3 Global Grain Group (a joint venture of US agribusiness Bunge and Saudi agricultural investment firm SALIC) purchased a majority interest in the Canadian Wheat Board and combined it with the grain assets of Bunge Canada. The other shareholder in G3 Canada Limited is the Farmers Equity Trust, which owns the Class B shares in the company.

G3 has built a network of grain handling facilities.

Grain elevators:

 Bloom, Manitoba, and Colonsay, Saskatchewan opened in 2015.
 Glenlea, Manitoba, and Pasqua, Saskatchewan opened in 2016.
 Melville and Saskatoon, Saskatchewan opened in 2018.
 Maidstone, Saskatchewan opened in 2019.
 Wetaskiwin, Morinville, Carmangay, Irricana, and Stettler County, Alberta opened in 2020.
 Vermilion, Alberta, and Swift Current, Saskatchewan opened in 2021.
Melfort, Saskatchewan and Rycroft, Alberta due to open in 2023.
G3 also operates grain elevators in Leader, Kindersley, and near Plenty, Saskatchewan

Port terminals:

 G3 built a new grain export terminal at the Port of Hamilton, Ontario, which opened in 2017.
 The company operates port terminals at the Port of Thunder Bay, Ontario, Trois Rivières and Québec City, Québec.
 In 2020, the company opened G3 Terminal Vancouver, a new grain export terminal at the Port of Vancouver in North Vancouver, British Columbia. G3 Terminal Vancouver is a joint venture of G3 Global Holdings and Western Stevedoring Company Limited.

References

External links
Official website

Canadian companies established in 2015
Companies based in Winnipeg
Agricultural organizations based in Manitoba
Agriculture companies of Canada
Grain elevators
Grain companies